Below are the details of the types of narrow-gauge steam locomotives designed and built by the Hunslet Engine Company.

Individual examples of some of these types have been preserved on heritage railways.

See also
 List of preserved Hunslet narrow-gauge locomotives
 List of preserved Hunslet Austerity 0-6-0ST locomotives

Notes
1. Two articulated Hunslet Engine  diesel locomotives were supplied to the Royal Arsenal, Woolwich: Albert in 1934 (scrapped in 1961) and Carnegie in 1954. Carnegie was later sold, subsequently rescued and moved to the Bicton Woodland Railway in 1966. She then moved to the Waltham Abbey Royal Gunpowder Mills and thence to the Statfold Barn Railway.

References

Hunslet locomotives
Hunslet narrow gauge locomotives
United Kingdom narrow gauge rolling stock
Narrow gauge locomotives